Stathmopoda holochra is a moth of the family Stathmopodidae. It was described by Edward Meyrick in 1889 using specimens first collected at the Wellington Botanic Garden. It is endemic to New Zealand. The larvae of this species feed on Phormium seed heads.

Description

References

Moths described in 1889
Stathmopodidae
Taxa named by Edward Meyrick
Moths of New Zealand
Endemic fauna of New Zealand
Endemic moths of New Zealand